The 1999 Nigerian Senate election in Borno State was held on February 20, 1999, to elect members of the Nigerian Senate to represent Borno State. Maina Maaji Lawan representing Borno North and Abubakar Mahdi representing Borno South won on the platform of Peoples Democratic Party, while Ali Modu Sheriff representing Borno Central won on the platform of the All Nigeria Peoples Party.

Overview

Summary

Results

Borno North 
The election was won by Maina Maaji Lawan of the Peoples Democratic Party.

Borno South 
The election was won by Abubakar Mahdi of the Peoples Democratic Party.

Borno Central 
The election was won by Ali Modu Sheriff of the All Nigeria Peoples Party.

References 

Bor
Borno State Senate elections
February 1999 events in Nigeria